The Missisquoi Abenaki Tribe is a state-recognized tribe in Vermont, who claim descent from Abenaki people, specifically the Missiquoi people. 

They are not federally recognized as a Native American tribe. Vermont has no federally recognized tribes.

Name 
The Missisquoi Abenaki Tribe is also known as the Abenaki Nation of Missisquoi. They have also gone by the name St. Francis-Sokoki Band of the Abenaki Nation of Missisquoi, the Abenaki Tribal Council of Missisquoi, and the St. Francis/Sokoki Band of the Sovereign Republic of the Abenaki Nation of Missisquoi.

State-recognition 
Vermont recognized the Missisquoi Abenaki Tribe as 2012. The other state-recognized tribes in Vermont are the Nulhegan Band of the Coosuk Abenaki Nation, Elnu Abenaki Tribe, and the Koasek Abenaki Tribe.

Nonprofit organization 
In 2015, the group created Maquam Bay of Missisquoi, a 501(c)(3) nonprofit organization, based in Swanton, Vermont. Their registered agent is Richard Mendard.

Their mission is "To promote wellness in the Abenaki community through holistic approaches that integrate health, education, and the environment."

The Maquam Bay of Missisquoi board of directors are:
 April Lapan, treasurer
 Brian Barratt, director
 Chantel Bockus, director
 Joanne Crawford, secretary
 John Lavoie, officer
 Richard Mendard, director and agent.

Petition for federal recognition 
The Missisquoi Abenaki Tribe is the only Vermont state-recognized tribe to have petitioned for federal recognition.

Under the name St. Francis/Sokoki Band of Abenakis of Vermont, the group applied for but was denied federal recognition as a Native American tribe in 2007. The summary of the proposed finding (PF) stated that "The SSA petitioner claims to have descended as a group mainly from a Western Abenaki Indian tribe, most specifically, the Missisquoi Indians" and went on to state: "However, the available evidence does not demonstrate that the petitioner or its claimed ancestors descended from the St. Francis Indians of Quebec, a Missiquoi Abenaki entity in Vermont, any other Western Abenaki group, or an Indian entity from New England or Canada. Instead, the PF concluded that the petitioner is a collection of individuals of claimed but undemonstrated Indian ancestry 'with little or no social or historical connection with each other before the early 1970's'...."

Heritage 
The Missisquoi Abenaki Tribe is one of four state-recognized tribes in Vermont. It had 60 members in 2016.

St. Mary's University associate professor Darryl Leroux's genealogical and historical research found that the  members of this and the other three state-recognized tribes in Vermont were composed primarily of "French descendants who have used long-ago ancestry in New France to shift into an 'Abenaki' identity."

In 2002, the State of Vermont reported that the Abenaki people had migrated north to Quebec by the end of the 17th century.

Activities 
The Missisquoi Abenaki Tribe participate in Abenaki Heritage Weekend, held at the Lake Champlain Maritime Museum in Vergennes, Vermont.

Property tax 
Vermont H.556, "An act relating to exempting property owned by Vermont-recognized Native American tribes from property tax," passed on April 20, 2022.

See also 
 State v. Elliott, 616 A.2d 210 (Vt. 1992), Vermont Supreme Court decision

Notes

References

External links
 
 Vermont Commission on Native American Affairs
 Petitioner #068: St. Francis/Sokoki Band of Abenakis of Vermont, VT, U.S. Department of the Interior

Abenaki heritage groups
Cultural organizations based in Vermont
French American
Native American tribes in Vermont
State-recognized tribes in the United States